The Central District of Deylam County is in Bushehr province, Iran. At the 2006 census, its population was 24,696 in 5,403 households. The following census in 2011 counted 26,948 people in 6,710 households. At the latest census in 2016, the district had 29,955 inhabitants living in 8,535 households.

References 

Districts of Bushehr Province
Populated places in Deylam County